These are lists of battles of the Mongol invasion of Europe.

Lists of battles

Mongol invasions of Eastern Europe

Mongol invasion of Kievan Rus' (1223, 1237–1241)

Mongol invasion of Volga Bulgaria (1223–1236) 
 1223: First Mongol invasion of Volga Bulgaria. Battle of Samara Bend ends with Mongol defeat.
 1229–1230: Second Mongol invasion of Volga Bulgaria.
 1236: Third Mongol invasion of Volga Bulgaria; Volga Bulgaria and parts of Cumania were conquered.

Mongol invasions of the North Caucasus 
 1237–1242 Mongol invasion of Cumania
 1237–1253: Mongol invasion of Circassia
 13th century: Mongol invasions of Durdzuketia (modern Chechnya and Ingushetia)

Golden Horde battles (from 1242)

Mongol invasions of Central Europe (1240–1288) 

 1237–1240: Mongol invasions of Lithuania (first).
 late 1240–1241: First Mongol invasion of Poland (including Bohemia).
 March 1241 – April 1242: First Mongol invasion of Hungary
 1241: Battle of Legnica and Battle of Mohi. Devastation of parts of Poland and Hungary following Mongol victories. Some Mongol troops reaches the outskirts of Vienna and Udine. Death of Ögedei Khan; Retreat of Mongol-Tatar army.
 spring 1241 – early 1242: Mongol incursions in the Holy Roman Empire (including Austria and northeast Italy)
 1241–1242: Mongol invasion of Croatia
 1258–1259: Mongol invasions of Lithuania (second).
 1258–1260: Second Mongol invasion of Poland (including Halych-Volhynia and Lithuania).
 1275, 1279, 1325: Mongol invasions of Lithuania (reprises).
 1284–1285: Second Mongol invasion of Hungary.
 1287–1288: Third Mongol invasion of Poland.
 1337, 1340: Ruthenian-Tatar raids against Poland

Mongol invasions of Southeastern Europe 
 1241–1242: Mongol invasion of Moldavia and Wallachia
 1241–1242: Mongol invasion of Bulgaria and Serbia
 1242–1243: Mongol invasion of the Latin Empire
 1264/1265: Mongol invasion of Byzantine Thrace
 1271, 1274, 1282 and 1285: Raids against Bulgaria.
 1291: Serbian conflict with the Nogai Horde.
 1324 and 1337: Tatar incursions against Byzantine Thrace.

See also
 Destruction under the Mongol Empire
 Genghis Khan

References

Further reading
Vasily Klyuchevsky, The Course of Russian History, Vol. 2.

13th-century conflicts
13th century in Hungary
Battles of the Mongol invasion of Kievan Rus'
History of Poland during the Piast dynasty
History of the Turkic peoples
Europe
Mongol
battles of the Mongol invasion of Europee